Redemption Trail is a 2013 American drama film written and directed by Britta Sjogren and starring Lily Rabe, LisaGay Hamilton, Jake Weber and Hamish Linklater.

Plot

Two strong, yet deeply troubled women - struggling with political and personal trauma - try to escape pasts that haunts them. Tess, the daughter of a murdered Black Panther, lives off the grid on a Sonoma vineyard, detached from any sort of human connection. Her life of solitude is shattered when she gives reluctant shelter to a desperate young woman, Anna. An unlikely companionship forms, where other close relationships have failed. But the very difference between the two women opens them up to a new vision of themselves, as not only survivors, but as heroes.  Bravely reclaiming independence, and their personal life, they charge forward, towards an unknown, transformative future.

Cast
Lily Rabe as Anna
LisaGay Hamilton as Tess
Hamish Linklater as David
Jake Weber as John
Asta Sjogren-Uyehara as Ruby
Juliette Stubbs as Juliet
Stephanie Diaz as Cecelia
Beth Lisick as Larraine

Production
The film's production took place over the summer of 2011 in the Stubbs Vineyard, Marin County, Petaluma and Oakland, California.

Release
The film had its world premiere at the Mill Valley Film Festival in October 2013, winning the audience award.

References

External links
 
 

American drama films
2013 drama films
2013 films
Films shot in California
Films scored by Mark Orton
2010s English-language films
2010s American films